Mark Gerald Kingwell  (born March 1, 1963) is a Canadian professor of philosophy and associate chair at the University of Toronto's Department of Philosophy. Kingwell is a fellow of Trinity College. He specialises in theories of politics and culture.

Kingwell has published twenty books, most notably, A Civil Tongue: Justice, Dialogue, and the Politics of Pluralism, which was awarded the Spitz Prize for political theory in 1997. In 2000 Kingwell received an honorary Doctor of Fine Arts from the Nova Scotia College of Art and Design, for contributions to theory and criticism. He has held visiting posts at  institutions including: University of Cambridge, University of California at Berkeley, and City University of New York where he held the title of Weissman Distinguished Professor of Humanities.

He studied at the University of Toronto, editing The Varsity through 1983 to 1984 and the University of Toronto Review from 84-85. He received his BA degree from St. Michael's College with High Distinction in 1985, his MLitt degree from the University of Edinburgh in 1987, and both his M.Phil and PhD degrees from Yale University in 1989 and 1991 respectively. He was married to Gail Donaldson in 1988. The marriage ended in divorce in 2004. In 2018 he was named a fellow of the Royal Society of Canada.

Kingwell is a contributing editor to Harper's Magazine, the literary quarterly Descant, the political monthly This Magazine and The Globe and Mails books section.   He was also a drinks columnist for the men's magazine Toro.  He was formerly a columnist for the National Post, and a contributing editor of Saturday Night. He frequently appears on television and radio, often on the CBC, and is well known for his appearance in the documentary film The Corporation. He has delivered the George Grant, Harold Innis, Marx Wartofsky and Larkin-Stuart memorial lectures.

Kingwell’s work has been translated into ten languages, and he lectures to academic and popular audiences around the world. From 2001 to 2004, he was chair of the Institute for Contemporary Culture at the Royal Ontario Museum. His work on philosophy, art, and architecture has appeared in many leading academic journals and magazines, including The Journal of Philosophy, The Philosophical Forum, Ethics, Political Theory, Yale Journal of Law and the Humanities, The New York Times and The New York Times Magazine, Utne Reader, Adbusters, The Walrus, Harvard Design Magazine, Canadian Art, Azure, Toronto Life, The Globe and Mail, and National Post.

He describes himself as a social democrat and a "recovering Catholic." According to the Canadian Who's Who 2006, he also enjoys running, baseball, basketball, jazz, films and pop music. He has two brothers: Sean and Steven.

Publications
A Civil Tongue: Justice, Dialogue, and the Politics of Pluralism, Pennsylvania State University Press, 1995,  (hardcover),  (paperback).
Dreams of Millennium: Report from a Culture on the Brink, Faber & Faber, 1997, 
In Pursuit of Happiness: Better Living from Plato to Prozac, Crown Publishing Group (NY), 2000, 
The World We Want: Restoring Citizenship in a Fractured Age, Rowman & Littlefield, 2001, .
Practical Judgments: Essays in Culture, Politics, and Interpretation, University of Toronto Press, 2002,  (hardcover),  (paperback)
Catch and Release: Trout Fishing and the Meaning of Life, Penguin Canada, 2003, 
Nothing for Granted: Tales of War, Philosophy, and Why the Right Was Mostly Wrong: Selected Writings 2000-2003, Penguin Canada, 2005, 
Nearest Thing to Heaven: The Empire State Building and American Dreams, Yale University Press, 2006, 
Marginalia: A Cultural Reader, Penguin Canada, 1999, 
Classic Cocktails: A Modern Shake, McClelland & Stewart, 2006, 
Concrete Reveries: Consciousness and the City, Penguin Group Canada, 2008, 
The Idler's Glossary, (co-authored with Joshua Glenn; illustrated by Seth), Biblioasis, 2008, 
Opening Gambits: Essays on Art and Philosophy, Key Porter Books, 2008, 
Glenn Gould, Viking, 2009, 
Rites of Way: The Politics and Poetics of Public Space, (co-edited with Patrick Turmel), Wilfrid Laurier University Press, 2009, 
Unruly Voices: Essays on Democracy, Civility and the Human Imagination, Biblioasis, 2012, 
Fail Better: Why Baseball Matters, Biblioasis, 2017, 
Wish I Were Here: Boredom and the Interface, McGill-Queen's University Press, 2019, 
On Risk, Biblioasis, 2020, 
The Ethics of Architecture (Ethics in Context), Oxford University Press, 2021,

References

External links 

 University of Toronto: Department of Philosophy bio
 Interview with Mark about The Idler's Glossary The Lance, Nov. 12, 2008
 An interview with Mark Kingwell on Notebook on Cities and Culture

1963 births
Living people
20th-century Canadian philosophers
21st-century Canadian philosophers
Alumni of the University of Edinburgh
Harper's Magazine people
University of St. Michael's College alumni
University of Toronto alumni
Academic staff of the University of Toronto
Yale University alumni